Spaghetti alla Nerano is an Italian pasta dish invented in the Italian village of Nerano, on the Sorrento peninsula. Its main ingredients are pasta, fried zucchini and provolone del Monaco (or caciocavallo).

Among the many attributions circulating, the main one points to a restaurant owner named Maria Grazia in the mid-1950s. The restaurant still exists to this day.

See also 
 Spaghetti dishes
 List of squash and pumpkin dishes

References 

Italian cuisine
Cuisine of Campania
Spaghetti dishes
Squash and pumpkin dishes